Ahmed Mooge Liibaan (1943-1997) was a prominent Somali musician and singer. He was the brother of Mohamed Mooge Liibaan, another prominent Somali artist, and is also the father of the current Mayor of Somaliland's capital Hargeisa, Abdikarim Ahmed Mooge.

Discography 

 Ii taageer Allahayow
 Liilalow
 Soo dhiib waraaqaha
 Dad hadaad is qabataan
 Anaa Jamashadaa qaba
 Allihii joogay baa Jira
 Gaasira
 Ammaantaada inanyoow 
 Ma ogtahay
 Jid carow

See also
Abdikarim Ahmed Mooge
Waaberi
Music of Somalia
Abdullahi Qarshe
Ali Feiruz
Maryam Mursal
Mohamed Sulayman Tubeec

References

External links 
https://masuul.com/hees/artist/a/ahmed-mooge-liibaan

20th-century Somalian male singers
1997 deaths
1943 births
Oud players
People from Hargeisa